Fires in Heaven is the second studio album by American witch house band Salem. It was released on October 30, 2020 via Mad Decent's Decent Distribution.

It was preceded by the lead 
single "Starfall", which was released on September 18, 2020 along its music video. It follows the band's trip with veteran storm trackers through Tulsa, Oklahoma and Dallas as well as through Texas during tornado season. It was directed by Donoghue and Holland along Tommy Malekoff. Along its pre-order on October 16, a second single called "Red River" was unveiled. The cover art used for the album is the oil painting 'Awakening' by Nicole Besack

Track listing
All songs written and produced by Salem, except where noted.

Notes

References

2020 albums
Salem (American band) albums
Mad Decent albums